The Chicago Bears are a professional American football team based in Chicago, Illinois. They are currently members of the North Division of the National Football Conference (NFC) in the National Football League (NFL), and are one of two remaining charter members of NFL.  Founded in 1919 by the A.E. Staley Company as the Decatur Staleys and based in Chicago since 1922, the Bears organization has become one of the most successful professional football teams, having won a total of nine professional American football championships—eight NFL Championships and one Super Bowl—second most in the NFL, behind the Green Bay Packers.  The franchise has recorded 18 NFL divisional titles, four NFL conference championships, and the most regular season victories of any NFL franchise.  In 1963, the Pro Football Hall of Fame was created to honor the history of professional American football and the individuals who have greatly influenced it.  Since the charter induction class of 1963, 32 individuals who have played, coached, or held an administrative position for the Bears have been inducted into the Pro Football Hall of Fame. The Bears hold the record for the most individuals enshrined in the Pro Football Hall of Fame.

Of the 36 inductees, 30 made their primary contribution to football with the Bears, while the other seven contributed only a minor portion of their career with the Bears.  Of the original 17 individuals inducted in 1963, three spent a majority of their careers with the Chicago Bears.  This includes the founder, long time owner, and head coach George Halas, long time halfback and two-way player Bronko Nagurski, and the "Galloping Ghost" Red Grange. The first few years of the Hall of Fame's existence saw 14 Bear players enshrined.  Jim Finks was enshrined due to his contributions to the team as a general manager, not a player. Mike Ditka was inducted into the Hall of Fame while serving as the team's head coach. The most recent Bears to be inducted were Ed Sprinkle and Jim Covert in 2020. In 2023, Chuck Howley who only played minor portion of his career with the Bears got elected as a Seniors candidate.

Inductees

Primary members

Minor portion of their career with The Bears/Staleys

Not Listed as a Chicago Bear in Hall of Fame Records

Footnotes
 The uniform number worn by the player as a member of the Bears.
 Only includes the seasons with the Chicago Bears organization.
 Ditka was inducted into the Hall of Fame for his service just as a tight end.
 Stanfel was inducted into the Hall of Fame for his service just as a player.

References
General
 
 

Specific

Hall of Fame
+Chicago Bears